Azat Valiullin (born 1 September 1990) is a Russian handball player for HSV Hamburg and the Russian national team.

He participated at the 2017 World Men's Handball Championship.

References

External links

1990 births
Living people
Sportspeople from Chelyabinsk
Russian male handball players
Expatriate handball players
Russian expatriate sportspeople in Germany
Handball-Bundesliga players